Karimabad-e Bala may refer to:
 Karimabad-e Bala, Anbarabad
 Karimabad-e Bala, Rafsanjan

See also
 Karimabad-e Olya (disambiguation)